Sazak is a village in the District of Mihalıççık, Eskişehir Province, Turkey.

The village is at  distance to the Province center Eskişehir and is  far from the district Mihalıççık. It is located on the foothills of Sündüken Mountain and on the banks of Porsuk River. Situated on the Eskişehir–Ankara railway, it has Sazak railway station.

The village has a primary school.

Population

Notable natives
 Emin Sazak (1882–1960), landowner and former politician, deputy of Eskişehir Province from Republican People's Party (CHP) and later from Democrat Party (DP). Father of ten children.
 Gün Sazak (1932–1980), son of Emin Sazak, was a nationalist politician and former Minister of Customs and Monopolies, who was assassinated by leftist militans.
 Güven Sazak (1932–2011), son of Emin Sazak, former President of Fenerbahçe SK.
 Yılmaz Sazak (died 2000), son of Emin Sazak, former President of Turkey Athletic Federation.

References

Villages in Eskişehir Province